
The Varsey Rhododendron Sanctuary or Barsey Rhododendron Sanctuary occupies 104 km2 in the Singalila Range in western Sikkim. It borders on Nepal to the west, and on the state of West Bengal to the south across the Rambong Khola stream.  The rhododendrons bloom during March and April.

Fauna

Access
The Barsey Sanctuary can be reached from three points, Hilley, Dentam and Soreng. The most popular entry is Hilley since it is approachable by road and Varsey is only 4 km trek from this point along an undulating path shaded by different species of rhododendron.

Tourism 
Sikkim government has an arrangement for tourists to stay on top of the hill in a forest barrack. There are now several home-stays at the entrance of Versay Rhododendron Sanctuary as well as at Okhrey, which is a small village inhabited by mainly the Sherpa community.

References

External links

 
Protected areas of Sikkim
Wildlife sanctuaries in Sikkim
Protected areas established in 2004
2004 establishments in Sikkim